= University College of Azarabadegan =

- موسسه آموزش عالی آذرآبادگان
- Type: Private
- Established: 2006
- President: Dr. Javand Aghazadeh
- Academic staff: -
- Students: 1,500
- Location: Urmia, Iran
- Campus: Shahid Bahonar Highway, Urmia
- Nickname: UCA
- Website: http://www.uca.ac.ir

University College of Azerabadegan, established in 2006, is a private business school located in Urmia, Iran.
